Kanhangad State assembly constituency is one of the 140 state legislative assembly constituencies in Kerala state in southern India.  It is also one of the 7 state legislative assembly constituencies included in the Kasaragod Lok Sabha constituency.
 As of the 2021 assembly elections, the current MLA is  E. Chandrasekharan of CPI.

Kanhangad constituency came into existence in 2011. Before it was known as Hosdurg constituency from 1957 to 2011.

Local self governed segments
Kanhangad Niyamasabha constituency is composed of the following local self-governed segments:

Members of Legislative Assembly
The following list contains all members of Kerala legislative assembly
who have represented Kanhangad Niyama Sabha Constituency during the period of various assemblies:

Key:

   

As Hosdurg

As Kanhangad

Election results

Niyamasabha Election 2021

Niyamasabha Election 2016 
There were 2,04,931 registered voters in the constituency for the 2016 election.

Niyamasabha Election 2011 
There were 1,78,139 registered voters in the constituency for the 2011 election.

Niyamasabha Election 1952

References 

Assembly constituencies of Kerala

State assembly constituencies in Kasaragod district